Kisi Ki Nazarr Na Lage is a Hindi language Indian drama television series that airs on DD National channel. The series is produced by Raja Mukherjee, brother of the Bollywood actress Rani Mukherjee.  The story is of a joint Bengali family and spans three generations of characters. The series airs every Monday – Friday at 1pm IST.

References

DD National original programming
Indian drama television series
Indian television series